Parviturbo germanus is a species of minute sea snail, a marine gastropod mollusk in the family Skeneidae.

Description
The height of the subdiscoidal shell attains 0.75 mm, its diameter 1.3 mm

Distribution
This species occurs in the Pacific Ocean, off Colombia and Ecuador.

References

germanus
Gastropods described in 1945